Ian Pringle may refer to:

Ian Pringle (director), Australian film director, producer and screenwriter
Ian Pringle (canoeist) (born 1953), Irish sprint canoeist